Pia Douwes (born 5 August 1964) is a Dutch actress in musical theatre in Europe. She is best known for having created the title role in the German-language musical Elisabeth.

Biography
Douwes was born in Amsterdam, North Holland, The Netherlands, as Petronella Irene Allegonda Douwes, to an arts dealer and a social worker, and is the grandniece of Doris Day. Initially Douwes wanted to become a nurse for mentally handicapped children, then she danced in a disco when she was 19 years old and realised that she wanted to dance. She went to London and searched for a dance school in the Yellow Pages. She chose the Brooking School of Ballet. Without any prior dance education, she auditioned (with a sprained ankle) and was accepted. One year later she attended a musical workshop with Susi Nicoletti and Sam Cane in Vienna. Cane is said to have told Douwes' father at that time: "If she doesn't become a star, I'll hang myself!"

In 1986, she got her first small part in the German-language premiere of Little Shop of Horrors in Vienna. More small parts followed, and in 1987 she got her first part in a larger production, as a Swing in Cats in Amsterdam. With this production she toured Russia in 1988, playing Grizabella and Jellylorum.

More parts followed, including Fantine in the original Amsterdam production of Les Misérables in 1991, but the great break came in 1992, when she got the title role in the world premiere of Elisabeth in Vienna, Austria. Though the Viennese papers wrote a lot of scathing criticism, such as "Munter geht die Sisi unter" ("Sisi perishes") and they denied Douwes singing and acting talent of any kind, Douwes became (along with Uwe Kröger) an acclaimed musical star and reprised the title role numerous times. Elisabeth is today the most successful German-language musical of all-time.

Until 1994 she played Elisabeth, then played more parts like Rizzo in Grease (Vienna) and Eva Perón in Evita in the Dutch touring production.

She was also active in other areas; she sang and spoke the leading part for the Dutch versions of the movies Pocahontas and Pocahontas II: Journey to a New World. Additionally she did the gala evenings In love with Musical along with her colleagues Uwe Kröger, Marika Lichter and Viktor Gernot.

In 1999 she played Velma Kelly in the Dutch premiere of Chicago. Then Douwes went back to her roots and played the leading part of Elisabeth again in the Dutch and German premieres of the musical.

In March 2003 she got the chance to play Milady de Winter in the world premiere of the Dutch musical 3 Musketiers (The Three Musketeers). The musical was later recorded (with her) and is now available on DVD.

In 2004 she played Velma Kelly in Chicago again, but this time she performed in the West End of London and then on Broadway, being the first Dutch actress to take a leading role in a production on Broadway.

Back again in the Netherlands she played Clara in Passion. Then she went back to Germany to play  Milady de Winter again in the German premiere of 3 Musketiere in Theater des Westens in Berlin. She played the part until 30 October 2005.

In 2007, she was seen as a judge on Op zoek naar Evita (In search for Evita), a Dutch reality show. The winner was cast as Eva Perón, a role Douwes played over a decade ago, in a new Dutch production of Evita.

In 2008, Pia was a judge on the German reality show Ich Tarzan du Jane in which they looked for both Tarzan and Jane to star in the German production of Tarzan and returned as a judge and coach on "Op zoek naar Joseph", similar to the search for Evita, but this series searched for the male lead in the musical Joseph and the Amazing Technicolor Dreamcoat.

In late 2008, she donned the turban as the infamous Norma Desmond in the Dutch touring production of Andrew Lloyd Webber's Sunset Boulevard, alternating in the lead role with her friend and previous Les Misérables, Chicago and Fosse co-star, Simone Kleinsma.

In 2009 she returned yet again to judge and coach the contestants of a new Op Zoek Naar... series, this time searching for the woman who would play Mary Poppins.

After the program ended, Pia played the role 'Velma Kelly' for six weeks on the West End in 2009.

From August 2010 until January 2011 she played the 'Killer Queen' in the rock musical We Will Rock You in Utrecht.

She then toured all over the Netherlands with the Dutch production of Master Class, in which she played the part of Maria Callas. The tour lasted until the end of May 2011, with two extra performances in September 2011.

Pia has played the role of Mrs. Danvers in the Stuttgart production of Rebecca, Claire Zachanassian in the Vienna production of Der Besuch der alten Dame, Diane in the Fürth production of Next To Normal, and currently she is playing Mrs. Wilkinson in the Dutch production of Billy Elliot the Musical.

Pia Douwes is the most famous European musical actress alongside Ute Lemper. She has taken part in over 25 CD productions, and was a duet partner of José Carreras.

Musical Engagements
 1986 - Little Shop of Horrors, Crystal in Vienna
 1986 - 1987Sammy Mario and Dancers, Dancer in Vienna
 1987 - Cats, Swing, Grizabella, Jellylorum in Amsterdam
 1988 - 1989 Cats, Grizabella, Jellylorum, Demeter in Vienna
 1988 - Cats, Grizabella, Jellylorum at the tour through Russia
 1990 - West Side Story, Maria at the tour through Belgium and the Netherlands
 1991 - 1992 Les Misérables, Fantine in Amsterdam & Schevenigen
 1992 - 1994 Elisabeth, Empress Elisabeth in Vienna
 1994 Other People's Money, Kate Sullivan in Prague
 1994 West Side Story, Maria in Summer of Musical Amstetten
 1994 - 1995 Grease, Rizzo in Vienna
 1995 / 1996 Cabaret, Sally Bowles in Bad Hersfeld, Germany
 August 10, 1995 Cats, Grizabella and guest at the premiere in Vienna
 1995 - 1996 and January 1997 Evita, Eva Péron at the tour through the Netherlands
 1997 Rocky Horror Show, Janet in Bad Hersfeld, Germany
 1997 - 1999 Dance! Dance! Dance!, Soloist in Vienna
 1997 - 1998 Jane Eyre, Jane Eyre at the tour through the Netherlands
 November 1998 Savanah Bay, Young Woman in the Netherlands
 December 1999 The Andrew Lloyd Webber Musical Gala, Soloist at the tour through Germany
 1999 Chicago, Velma Kelly in Utrecht
 1999 - 2000 Elisabeth, Elisabeth in Schevenigen
 2000 Sweeney Todd, Beggar Woman, Debut in the West End of London
 December 2000 Cole Porter's Songbook, Soloist
 2001 - 2002 Elisabeth, Empress Elisabeth in Essen
 2002 Fosse, Soloist at the tour through the Netherlands
 2003 - 2004 3 Musketiers, Milady de Winter in Rotterdam
 2004 Chicago, Velma Kelly in London
 2004 Chicago, Velma Kelly, Debut on broadway
 2004 - 2005 Passion, Clara at the tour through the Netherlands
 2005 3 Musketiere, Milady de Winter in Berlin
 2006 Cabaret in Amsterdam
 2006 Elisabeth, Empress Elisabeth in Stuttgart
 November 2006 - March 4, 2007 3 Musketiere, Milady de Winter in Stuttgart
 April - June 2007 Best of Musical 2007
 July 2007 Cats, Grizabella
 December 5, 2007, Chicago: 10th Anniversary Gala" as Velma Kelly.
 2008 04.01. - 27.01. Die drei Musketiere, Milady de Winter in Stuttgart
 2008 20.04 - 06.07  Elisabeth, Empress Elisabeth in Berlin
 2008-2009 Sunset Boulevard
 2009 14.09 - 24.10 Chicago, West End as Velma Kelly
 September 2010 - December 2010 We will rock you, The Netherlands as Killer Queen
 December 2011 - 2013 Rebecca, Stuttgart, Germany as Mrs. Danvers 
 October 2013 Next to normal - fast normal German Premiere as "Diana"
 2014 11.30 Billy Elliot - Mrs. Wilkinson (Scheveningen, 2014.11.30 - )
 2018 The Addams Family - Morticia Addams
 2019 Elisabeth in Concert - as Empress Elisabeth (Schloss Schönbrunn, Vienna)
 2022  The Prom (Musical) - Dee Dee Allen (Holland Tour)

Discography
 1987 Cats, Cast recording
 1989 It's time to say we care, Single for the benefit of the Aids-Gala in Vienna
 1991 Les Misérables, Cast recording
 1992 Hier sta ik, Single
 1992 Ich gehör nur mir / I belong to me, Single
 1992 Elisabeth, Cast recording
 1994 Aidan Bell: Time Warp Duett: Maybe we can make it
 1994 Grease, Live recording
 1995 Living Water, Benefit CD
 1995 Musical Christmas in Vienna, Sampler
 1995 Pocahontas, Original Soundtrack Holland
 1995 Evita, Cast recording
 1995 Cabaret, Cast recording
 1996 Stars singen Weihnachtslieder, Sampler
 1996 Rocky Horror Show, Cast recording
 1997 Still in love with Musical, Live recording
 1997 Shades of night, Musicals go rock, Sampler
 1998 10 für Zehn, Benefit CD
 1998 Pocahontas II, Original Soundtrack Holland
 1998 Joop van den Enden presenteert: De beste uit de musicals, Sampler
 1998 Chicago, Cast recording
 1999 Elisabeth, Cast recording (Netherlands)
 1999 Mijn leven is van mij, Single (Dutch version of Ich gehör nur mir / I belong to me)
 2000 Die fantastische Welt des Musicals, Sampler
 2000 Alles Musical, Sampler
 2000 Hoogtepunten uit de musicals, aangeboden door Persil, Sampler
 2000 Hilversum Calling, Sampler
 2000 Zing dan! Luisterliedjes, Sampler
 2001 Ernst Daniel Smit e amici: Una voce particulare - Duet, Sampler "Tu Cosa Fai Stasera"
 2001 Elisabeth, Cast recording in Essen, Germany
 2001 3 CD-Track: "Ich gehör nur mir", Single
 2001 In love with musical again, Live recording
 2001 Steve Barton memorial concert, Live recording
 2001 Uwe Kröger: Only the best
 2001 Uwe Kröger: Musical Moments
 2002 Het mooiste uit de nederlandse musicals, Sampler
 2002 Fosse (Bye bye, blackbird), Promotional single
 2003 De drie Musketiers, Cast recording
 2003 De drie Musketiers - Special Edition, Cast recording, extra's CD & DVD
 2003 Uwe Kröger: Musical Moments 2
 2004 Het mooiste uit de nederlandse musicals II, Sampler
 2004 Passion, Cast recording
 2005 Die drei Musketiere, Cast recording
 2006 Cabaret, Cast recording
 2007 Dezemberlieder (December Songs), Solo CD of Maury Yeston's famous song cycle in German language
 2009 Sunset Boulevard CD to the Dutch Tourproduction, complete live recording with Simone Kleinsma (disc 1) and some studiotracks with Pia Douwes (disc 2)

Awards and nominations
 Image 1996 for Elisabeth in Vienna [Won]
 1996 Bad Hersfeld Audience Award for Cabaret in Bad Hersfeld [Won]
 2000 John Kraaijkamp Musical Award, Best Actress in a Leading Role for Elisabeth in Scheveningen [Nominated]
 2002 John Kraaijkamp Musical Award, Best Actress Abroad  for Elisabeth in Essen [Won]
 2003 John Kraaijkamp Musical Award, Best Actress in a Leading Role for 3 Musketiers in Rotterdam [Nominated]
 2005 John Kraaijkamp Musical Award, Best Actress in a Supporting Role for Passion in the Netherlands [Nominated]
 2006 Da Capo Award, Best Musical Actress for 3 Musketiere in Berlin [Won]
 2006 Da Capo Award, Best Female Voice [Won], she won this award 6 times.
 2014 John Kraaijkamp Musical Award, Best Actress in a Leading Role  for Billy Elliot the Musical in Scheveningen [Nominated]

Pia has also been given the award for Female Leading Role six times by the readers of the German magazine "Musicals" for her performances in Elisabeth also the best Female with the most beautiful voice.

References

External links
 Official website and fanclub: www.piadouwes.com (in Dutch, German and English)
 

1964 births
Actresses from Amsterdam
Dutch musical theatre actresses
Dutch sopranos
Dutch women singers
Living people